The 1983 Gongola State gubernatorial election occurred on August 13, 1983. NPN's Bamanga Tukur won election for a first term, defeating former governor, NPP's Abubakar Barde and others, in the contest.

Electoral system
The Governor of Gongola State was elected using the plurality voting system.

Results
The NPN candidate, Bamanga Tukur, defeated the decampee ex-governor, NPP's Abubakar Barde to win the contest.

References 

Gongola State gubernatorial election
August 1983 events in Nigeria
Gongola State gubernatorial elections